Happy Traum (born Harry Peter Traum, May 9, 1938, The Bronx, New York) is an American folk musician who started playing music in the 1950s and became a stalwart of the Greenwich Village music scene of the 1960s and the Woodstock music scene of the 1970s and 1980s.  For several years, he studied blues guitar with Brownie McGhee, who was a big influence on his guitar style. Happy is most famously known as one half of Happy and Artie Traum, a duo he began with his brother. They released several albums, including Happy and Artie Traum (1969, Capitol), Double Back (1971, Capitol), and Hard Times In The Country (1975, Rounder). He has continued as a solo artist and as founder of Homespun Music Instruction.

Career

Collaborations with Bob Dylan
Traum first appeared on record at a historic session in late 1962 when a group of young folk musicians, including Bob Dylan, Phil Ochs, Pete Seeger, Peter LaFarge and The Freedom Singers, gathered in the studio at Folkways Records to record an album called Broadside Ballads, Vol. 1.  With his group, The New World Singers, Traum cut the first version of "Blowin' in the Wind" to be released (early 1963). Traum also sang a duet with Dylan, who performed under the pseudonym Blind Boy Grunt, on his anti-war song "Let Me Die in My Footsteps". These tracks were re-released in August 2000 by Smithsonian Folkways as part of a boxed set, The Best of Broadside 1962 - 1988: Anthems from the American Underground. Later that year, The New World Singers, which featured Traum, Bob Cohen and Gil Turner, recorded an album for Atlantic Records, with liner notes by Dylan. The album featured the first recording of Dylan's "Don't Think Twice, It's All Right"

In 1971 Happy once again joined Dylan in the studio, playing guitar, banjo, bass, and singing harmony on four songs, which appeared on Bob Dylan's Greatest Hits Vol. II and The Bootleg Series Vol. 10 – Another Self Portrait (1969–1971). Dylan also invited Happy to participate in a famous session with poet Allen Ginsberg, which resulted in the box set Holy Soul Jelly Roll.

Discography

Solo
 1980  Bright Morning Stars With John Sebastian, Roly Salley, Richard Manuel and Larry Campbell
 1975, Relax Your Mind, Kicking Mule Records KM110 (LP)
 1977, American Stranger, Kicking Mule Records KM301 (LP)
 1987, Buckets of Songs, Shanachie (CD)
 2005, I Walk The Road Again, Roaring Stream Records (CD)
 2015, "Just For the Love Of It," Lark's Nest Music (CD)

With Artie Traum
1970 Happy and Artie Traum - Capitol Records (LP)
1971 Double Back - Capitol Records (LP)
1975 Hard Times in the Country - Rounder Records (reissued as CD in 2005)
1994 The Test of Time - Roaring Stream Records (CD)
2006 Happy and Artie Traum Live Recordings 1970s and 1980s - Slice of Life Records

With various groups
1963 Broadside, Vol. 1 (both solo and with The New World Singers) - Folkways Records (with Bob Dylan, Phil Ochs, Pete Seeger, The Freedom Singers, and others).
1964 The New World Singers - Atlantic Records (liner notes by Bob Dylan)
1966 The Children of Paradise - Columbia Records (single) Happy and Artie Traum, Eric Kaz and Marc Silber.
1972 Mud Acres: Music Among Friends - Rounder Records (reissued on CD 2005) Happy and Artie produced and performed, along with Eric Kaz, Maria Muldaur, Jim Rooney, Bill Keith, John Herald, Lee Berg and Tony Brown.
1976 Woodstock Mountains: More Music from Mud Acres - Rounder (LP) with Happy and Artie, Pat Alger, Eric Andersen, Lee Berg, Rory Block, Paul Butterfield, John Herald, Bill Keith, Jim Rooney, Roly Salley, John Sebastian, Paul Siebel and others.
1978 Woodstock Mountains Revue: Pretty Lucky - Rounder (LP)
1981 Woodstock Mountains Revue: Back to Mud Acres - Rounder (LP)
1987 Woodstock Mountains: Music from Mud Acres - Rounder (CD)
1990 Bring It On Home, Vol. 1 and 2 - Sony Legacy (CD) The "Best of..." Happy and Artie's WAMC Public Radio show.
2000 The Best of Broadside – Smithsonian/Folkways Boxed Set

Recordings as a back-up musician
1971 Bob Dylan's Greatest Hits, Vol. 2 - Columbia
1971 Allen Ginsberg Holy Soul Jelly Roll with Bob Dylan (producer), David Amram, Ed Sanders, et al.
2014 Bob Dylan Another Self Portrait
 
Happy can also be heard on albums with, John Sebastian, Chris Smither, Jerry Jeff Walker, Tom Pacheco, Priscilla Herdman, Pete Seeger, Ronnie Gilbert, Eric Andersen, Rory Block, Maria Muldaur, Peter Tosh, Rick Danko, Levon Helm and many others.

See also
American folk music revival
Artie Traum
Brownie McGhee
Bob Dylan
Guitarists
Banjo

References

General sources

External links
Happy Traum Official Website
Happy Traum | Listen and Stream Free Music, Albums, New Releases, Photos, Videos Happy Traum on MySpace
Homespun Tapes
Homespun Instant Access downloads
The Official Bob Dylan Site Album Info from "Bob Dylan's Greatest Hits, Volume II" on Bob Dylan's website
Happy Traum Interview NAMM Oral History Library (2007)

American folk musicians
Fast Folk artists
1938 births
People from the Bronx
People from Greenwich Village
Living people